The Cisterns of La Malga or Cisterns of La Mâalga are a group of cisterns, which are among the most visible features of the archaeological site of Carthage near Tunis, Tunisia. They are some of the best preserved Roman cisterns.

They were designed to provide the water supply for Carthage, the most important city of Africa Proconsulare during the High Empire, and especially to supply the Baths of Antoninus.

As part of the site of Carthage, the cisterns are classified as a World Heritage Site by UNESCO. On 17 February 2012, the Tunisian government proposed that the whole Zaghouan-Carthage Roman hydraulic complex, of which they are a part, should be classed as a world heritage site.

History 

The large, relatively well-preserved cisterns are located on the north side of the ancient Roman city. They were not the only largest cisterns of Carthage, but existed alongside others: the "basins of Hamilcar" and those located on the hill of Bordj Djedid.

From the Middle Ages, the cisterns were used as makeshift houses, stables, barns or cellars by the local populations; a practice which continued until the twentieth century. For a long time this prevented archaeological investigation of the complex.

According to Al Idrisi, there were at least 24 cisterns in a single line, each with a length of 130 pace and a width of 26 pace - though Henri Saladin considered this width too high.

There is an active project to conserve and restore the site, and to develop a museum space devoted to it.

Description 
The group of cisterns forms a rectangular space measuring  x . There are fifteen individual cisterns, which are separated from one another and arranged in parallel.

Each vault has about ten circular openings. A cistern which distributed water to the others is aligned perpendicular to the others. A subsidiary aqueduct derived from the Zaghouan Aqueduct ran alongside the distribution cistern and supplied it with water through openings on its edge.

The presence of numerous circular openings on top of the each cistern's vault appear to be openings for water to escape through when the cisterns were too full or for collecting rain water. However, it is probable that the cisterns were actually surmounted by another level of tanks - in the same manner as Gallo-Roman two-story reservoirs.

The large cisterns were relied upon by the vast bath complex of Antoninus. The water flowed down from the cisterns to the baths through underground pipes.

See also
List of Roman cisterns
Carthage Punic Ports

References

External links 

 Jacques Vérité, « Le site de La Malga à Carthage », Bulletin du CEDAC, n°10, 1989, pp. 41-47
 Carthage romaine : 146 avant Jésus-Christ-698 après Jésus-Christ, Auguste Audollent, éd. Fontemoing, Paris, 1901, p. 295

La Malga
Carthage